Liberal-Labour may refer to:
 Liberal-Labour (UK)
 Liberal-Labour (Canada)
 Liberal–Labour (New Zealand)